Borbach may refer to:
Borbach (Ennepe), a river of North Rhine-Westphalia, Germany 
Borbach (Ruhr), a river of North Rhine-Westphalia, Germany

See also
Borbach Chantry, a building in West Dean, Sussex, England